Makhdoom (meaning one who is served and sometimes spelled Makhdum) is an Arabic word meaning "Teacher of Sunnah." It is a title for Pirs, in South and Central Asia.

People with the title Makhdoom
 Makhdoom Yahya Maneri (1263 - 1379 AD) – a mystic who lived in Bihar Sharif 
 Makhdoom Jahaniyan Jahangasht (1308- 1384 AD) - a world-traveling Sufi Saint who was spiritual master of king Firoz Shah Tughlaq, Ashraf Jahangir Simnani and 80 makhdooms of his time.                                                               
 Hamza Makhdoom – a mystic from Kashmir (d. 1563 AD)
 Makhdoom Mian Mir – a Sufi mystic from Lahore who laid first foundation of the Golden Temple in Amritsar
 Makhdoom Ali Mahimi – a Sufi saint from the Konkan in India
\Makhdoom Syed Yousaf Raza Gillani – a former Prime Minister of Pakistan
 Makhdoom Muhammad Ameen Faheem – a former Pakistani politician and leader of PPP
 Makhdoom Syed Faisal Saleh Hayat – a Pakistani politician affiliated with PML-Q and former Interior Minister of Pakistan
 Makhdoom Muhammad Javed Hashmi – a Pakistani politician, and central leader of PML-N
 Makhdoom Ali Khan – a former Attorney General of Pakistan
 Makhdoom Khusro Bakhtiar – a Pakistani politician, former Minister for Industries & Production of Pakistan
 Makhdoom Mohiuddin – an Urdu poet and Marxist politician from India
 Sayed Makhdoom Raheen – an ambassador of Afghanistan to India and former Information Minister of Afghanistan
 Makhdoom Shah Mehmood Qureshi – a Pakistani politician, former Foreign Minister of Pakistan
 Makhdoom Muhammad Zaman Talib-ul-Mola – the founding member of Pakistan Peoples Party and famous Sindhi poet 
 Makhdoom Shahabuddin – a Pakistani politician
 Ammar Aziz - a Pakistani filmmaker
 Shah Makhdum - a Sufi saint from Shahzadpur in Bangladesh.
 Shah Makhdum Rupos - a Sufi saint from the Varendra in Bangladesh.

References

Social groups of Pakistan
Titles in Pakistan
Titles in Bangladesh